We Will Never Part is a 1960 West German musical comedy film directed by Harald Reinl and starring Adrian Hoven, Vivi Bach and Kurt Großkurth.

It was shot at the Spandau Studios in Berlin. The film's sets were designed by the art directors Emil Hasler and Walter Kutz.

The film title was based on a popular song by Heidi Brühl.

Cast

References

Bibliography

External links 
 

1960 films
1960 musical comedy films
German musical comedy films
West German films
1960s German-language films
Films directed by Harald Reinl
Films set in Italy
Constantin Film films
Films shot at Spandau Studios
1960s German films